Margiotta is an Italian surname. Notable people with the surname include:

Adolfo Margiotta (born 1963), Italian actor and comedian
Francesco Margiotta (born 1993), Italian footballer
Joseph M. Margiotta (1927–2008), American politician
Massimo Margiotta (born 1977), Italian-Venezuelan footballer

Italian-language surnames